Jason Gary King (born 13 April 1985 in Maidstone, England) is a former motorcycle speedway rider, from England.

Career
King was formerly the club captain of Newcastle Diamonds in the British Premier League. 

He rode for various clubs from 2001 to 2012.

Family
His brother Danny King is also a speedway rider.

References 

1985 births
Living people
British speedway riders
English motorcycle racers
Sportspeople from Maidstone
Berwick Bandits riders
Lakeside Hammers riders
Mildenhall Fen Tigers riders
Newcastle Diamonds riders
Rye House Rockets riders
Somerset Rebels riders